Ross School is a private K-12 school located on 63 acres in the Town of East Hampton, on Long Island, New York, United States. Named after her late husband Steven J. Ross, the school was founded in 1991 by Courtney Sale Ross as a girls-only day school for their daughter Nicole and several of her friends. The original pre-nursery, nursery, and pre-kindergarten programs were discontinued in September 2020. Ross School transitioned to a co-ed boarding school in 2002 after its founder discontinued private funding. Students in grades 6-12 may board five days per week or full-time. The school has supplemented its budget by catering breakfast and lunch from its café to the Bridgehampton School and offering culinary arts and landscaping classes to East Hampton High School students.

A majority of the student body is international, with the highest-represented nations including Brazil, China, Japan, and Mexico. Head of School Bill O'Hearn has served in similar positions at the Beijing City International School in China and the Aga Khan Academy in Mombasa, Kenya.

In 2020, former Ross School student Hayden Soloviev and his father Stefan Soloviev filed a $10 million lawsuit against the school alleging that the student was subject to bullying, harassment, and threats by Ross School faculty.

Curriculum
Ross School's curriculum is based on world cultural history and the evolution of consciousness and reflects the collaborative work of its founding mentors, mathematician Ralph Abraham and cultural historian William Irwin Thompson. Cultural history is integrated with other academic subjects, such as language arts, math, and science, at every grade level. Field Academy takes place during a three-week period between the school's winter and spring terms. Students and teachers travel and work on intensive projects and courses covering an array of subjects at home and across the world. Since August 2016, a 20" Meade RCX 400 telescope of the Hamptons Observatory (formerly Montauk Observatory) has been housed at the Ross School, where students and stargazers gather for viewing and free astronomy lectures.

Campus
In 2018, the Ross School achieved the founder's original vision by closing its five-building Lower School location in Bridgehampton and moving the early childhood and elementary grades to the Upper School campus in East Hampton.

In 2000, the school proposed a 50-building,  expansion to its  campus which would have made it one of the biggest complexes in the Hamptons.  Environmentalists charged that Courtney Ross was polluting the debate by paying to protest proposed expansion of the Long Island Central Pine Barrens protections into East Hampton.  The school eventually backed down on the expansion.

COVID-19 Impact and Response
In response to a surge in applications during the summer of 2020 and spacing mandates related to COVID-19, Ross School reopened its Bridgehampton, NY campus. The Bridgehampton campus was listed for sale after the school moved its lower school program to its East Hampton campus, where its middle and high school grades are situated. The rise in enrollment was part of a trend seen across the East End as families from New York City moved east in pursuit of full-time, in-person schooling. Ross School operated on campus for the entirety of the 2020–21 school year, due in part to the extensive facilities on both campuses which allowed for maximum social distancing.

Summer events and programs
The Ross School hosts an annual fundraising event in June which has featured Aretha Franklin, the Jonas Brothers, Martha Stewart, Cyndi Lauper and Seth Meyers. The largest event to date was held in 2007: a series of five musical concerts entitled "Social @ Ross" with Prince; Dave Matthews and Tim Reynolds; Billy Joel; James Taylor and Tom Petty and the Heartbreakers. The price of a ticket to the series was $15,000.

Ross School’s 2021 summer programming includes three different programs for kids up to 18. Ross Summer Camp is held on the school’s Bridgehampton campus and includes both early childhood programs for ages 6 and under as well as camp programs for ages 7 and above. Campers choose a topic to focus on each week from five options (Artistry, Performance, Naturalist Explorers, Filmmaking/Stop-Motion Animation, or Inventors Workshop).

Ross Sports Camp utilizes the Ross School Tennis Academy facilities and coaches as well as the school’s extensive athletic fields and courts to offer a competitive summer tennis training program, as well as a NY Knicks Jr basketball camp, soccer camp with coaching staff from Colonial Sports, and a multisport camp.

Ross Summer Term offers summer courses for middle and high school students. They can earn academic credits in ESOL, STEAM, Math, English, and Cultural History and or enroll in enrichment courses and tutoring services in different subjects including Math, Science, ESOL, Studio Art, SAT Prep, and others.

College Admissions Public Resources
In June 2020, Ross School made its college counseling resources available to the public. In a series of videos, Ross college counseling staff cover topics related to the college application process including the Common Application, the college matching system Naviance, choosing extracurricular activities, utilizing social media to augment your application, applying to art school, and more. A workbook designed to help parents navigate the college application process, written by Andi O’Hearn, Ross School’s Head of Advancement and Operations, is also available for free download.

Nexus Lecture Series
In 2019 Ross School debuted a public lecture series aimed at bringing current thought leaders and experts in a variety of topics and backgrounds to the local community in order to facilitate an exchange of ideas and a sharing of insights. Speakers included Bob Roth, CEO of the David Lynch Foundation; Dr. Johannes Wagemann, a psychologist, anthropologist, and philosopher who is a professor of consciousness studies at Alanus University in Germany; Dr. Shefali Tsabary, a clinical psychologist who brings Eastern mindfulness into her practice; and iconic musician, composer, and performance artist Laurie Anderson.

Ross Institute
In 1996, Courtney Sale Ross founded Ross Institute for Advanced Study and Innovation in Education. The Institute provides training and certification for teachers interested in establishing schools based on the Ross School model. Mentors associated with Ross Institute include economist Jeremy Rifkin, scientist and engineer Danny Hillis, sociologist Pedro Noguera, neuroscientists Antonio and Hanna Damasio, paleoanthropologist Yves Coppens, and sociologist and media scholar Sherry Turkle. Among the universities and organizations that have worked with the Institute are Harvard's Graduate School of Education; NYU's Steinhardt School of Culture, Education, and Human Development; University of Southern California; Smithsonian Institution, Moorea Biocode Project, Moorea IDEA, and the National Geographic Society.

Notable alumni
Alumni
Alexa Ray Joel, singer
Scott Disick, reality television star
Victoria de Lesseps, artist
Tessa Gräfin von Walderdorff, socialite

References

External links
 Official page
 Ross School Summer Camp
 The Association of Boarding Schools profile
 Ross Institute

Private high schools in New York (state)
East Hampton (town), New York
Private elementary schools in New York (state)
Private middle schools in New York (state)
Schools in Suffolk County, New York